Abbasabad-e Bahrami (also Romanized as Abbāsābād-e Bahrāmī; also known as ‘Abbāsābād) is a village in Rigan Rural District, in the Central District of Rigan County, Kerman Province, Iran. At the 2006 census, its population was 648, in 157 families.

References 

Populated places in Rigan County